The Beatles were an English rock band from Liverpool who recorded hundreds of songs during their career. The group's "main catalogue"—songs released between 1962 and 1970—consists of 213 songs (four of which exist in different versions): 188 originals and 25 covers. Since their break-up, over 100 more songs by the group have been officially released, including live songs the group never recorded in the studio and numerous outtakes. The band also recorded several songs that remain unreleased. Often considered the most influential band of the rock era, the group's music pioneered new recording techniques and was primarily responsible for pop music's evolution into an art form. The majority of their recordings were produced by George Martin, who also played and composed string arrangements on multiple songs; his influence on the group led him to be referred to as the "Fifth Beatle". Between 1962 and 1968, the Beatles released their songs in both mono and stereo versions; Abbey Road and Let It Be were mixed and released only in stereo. Their songs often featured differences between the mixes and the group put the most effort into making the mono mixes. All mono mixes were remastered and released on The Beatles in Mono box set in 2009, along with the remastering of the band's entire catalogue in stereo.

Following their signing with EMI in 1962, each member of the Beatles contributed to songwriting. Their primary songwriters were the partnership of John Lennon and Paul McCartney, who composed most of the group's songs; lead guitarist George Harrison wrote 22 songs, including "While My Guitar Gently Weeps", "Something" and "Here Comes the Sun", while drummer Ringo Starr wrote two songs ("Don't Pass Me By" and "Octopus's Garden"), and was credited as co-writer for four others. While songs written by Lennon or McCartney were always credited to "Lennon–McCartney", the pair wrote many songs completely separately. These include "Come Together", "Strawberry Fields Forever" and "Nowhere Man" (Lennon) and "Hey Jude", "Let It Be" and "Yesterday" (McCartney), the last of which is one of the most covered songs of all time. Artists the band covered while together included Chuck Berry ("Roll Over Beethoven", "Rock and Roll Music"), Carl Perkins ("Matchbox", "Honey Don't"), Larry Williams ("Slow Down", "Dizzy Miss Lizzy") and Little Richard ("Long Tall Sally"). Cover songs were included on five of the band's core albums: Please Please Me and With the Beatles (both 1963), Beatles for Sale (1964), Help! (1965) and Let It Be (1970). Lead vocals were also shared by the group, with Starr usually contributing vocals to one song per album. The group were known for their harmonies, mostly two-part, but sang intricate three-part harmonies on "This Boy", "Yes It Is" and "Because".

Originally rooted in skiffle and 1950s rock and roll music, the group embraced pop music in their early years ("She Loves You", "I Want to Hold Your Hand"), but began to branch out into different genres, including folk rock (Help!, Rubber Soul), country ("Act Naturally", "Don't Pass Me By") and psychedelia (Sgt. Pepper's Lonely Hearts Club Band, Magical Mystery Tour). Their 1968 self-titled album (also known as the "White Album") in particular featured a wide range of styles, including ska ("Ob-La-Di, Ob-La-Da"), blues ("Yer Blues"), hard rock ("Helter Skelter" and the single version of "Revolution"), and a musique concrète sound collage ("Revolution 9"). The group also composed numerous ballads, including "Michelle" and "The Long and Winding Road". During their career, the Beatles introduced more innovations into popular music than any other rock band of the 20th century. Some of these include one of the first uses of guitar feedback in music ("I Feel Fine"), the first use of a fade-in in a pop song ("Eight Days a Week"), use of tape loops ("Tomorrow Never Knows"), using the recording studio as an instrument (Revolver and Sgt. Pepper) and popularising the Indian sitar in pop music ("Norwegian Wood"); Harrison further embraced Indian music on songs such as "Love You To", "Within You Without You" and "The Inner Light". Abbey Road (1969) featured prominent use of the Moog synthesiser and the Leslie speaker, along with a medley of song fragments edited together to form a single piece.

Along with their main catalogue, over 100 previously unreleased songs have been released on numerous live albums, compilations, and deluxe editions. These include demos, outtakes, songs the group only recorded live and not in the studio and, for The Beatles Anthology in the 1990s, two reunion songs: "Free as a Bird" and "Real Love". The Beatles remain one of the most acclaimed and influential artists in popular music history. Their songs have been covered thousands of times by a wide range of artists and continue to be celebrated throughout the world.

Main songs

Between 1963 and 1966, the Beatles' songs were released on different albums in the United Kingdom and the United States. In the UK, 30 songs were released as non-album singles, while appearing on numerous albums in the US. Since the remastering of the band's catalogue on CDs in the 1980s, the Beatles have a primary "core catalogue" of 14 albums:
 Please Please Me (1963)
 With the Beatles (1963)
 A Hard Day's Night (1964)
 Beatles for Sale (1964)
 Help! (1965)
 Rubber Soul (1965)
 Revolver (1966)
 Sgt. Pepper's Lonely Hearts Club Band (1967)
 Magical Mystery Tour (1967)
 The Beatles ("The White Album", 1968)
 Yellow Submarine (1969)
 Abbey Road (1969)
 Let It Be (1970)
The catalogue also includes the 1988 compilation album Past Masters, which collected 25 of the Beatles' 30 non-album singles, along with the 1964 EP Long Tall Sally and other rarities that were commercially available in the 1960s.

Other released songs
In addition to their main catalogue, over 100 songs that were recorded by the group have been released. Four songs have only appeared in two of the groups' films: one in Magical Mystery Tour (1967) and three in Let It Be (1970). The first release of new recordings was Live at the BBC in 1994, which features live performances of mostly cover songs that were recorded on various BBC Light Programme radio shows between 1963 and 1965. Further recordings from these shows were released on On Air – Live at the BBC Volume 2 in 2013. The Beatles Anthology project in the 1990s featured rarities, outtakes and live performances across their entire career, along with the reunion songs "Free as a Bird" and "Real Love", which were recorded as demos by Lennon before his death in 1980 and completed by the surviving Beatles. Further recordings have been released on various compilation albums and deluxe editions.

See also
The Beatles discography

Notes

References

Sources

 
 
 
 
 
 
 
 
 
 
 
 
 
 
 
 
 
 
 
 
 
 
 
 

 
Beatles
Beatles, The